Emamzadeh Hashem (also Romanized as Emāmzādeh Hāshem; also known as Imāmzādeh Hashim and Imamzadekh-Gashim) is a village in Saravan Rural District, Sangar District, Rasht County, Gilan Province, Iran. At the 2006 census, its population was 2,395, in 662 families.

References 

Populated places in Rasht County